Ora Hotels–Carrera is a professional road bicycle racing team licensed in Hungary, that compete in the UCI Continental Circuits. Starting from 2011 it has three main sponsors, international hotel chain Ora Hotels, bicycle manufacturer Carrera and fittings producer D SIGN.

Major wins
2007
Beograd–Banja Luka II, Zsolt Der
Stages 5 & 7 Presidential Cycling Tour of Turkey, Zsolt Der
Stage 6 Tour de Serbie, Zsolt Der
 Road Race Championships, Zsolt Der
Prologue GP de Gemenc, Péter Kusztor
GP Betonexpressz 2000, Zsolt Der
Overall Paths of Victory Tour, Zoltan Remak
Stage 4, Zoltan Remak
2008
GP Hydraulika Mikolasek, Péter Kusztor
Overall Tour of Romania, Rida Cador
Stage 1, Davide D'Angelo
Stage 4, Rida Cador
 Road Race Championships, Zoltan Madaras
GP Bradlo, Péter Kusztor
GP Betonexpressz 2000, Péter Kusztor
GP P-Nivo, Gergely Ivanics
Stage 3 Tour of Szeklerland, Daniele Colli
2009
 Road Race Championships, Honorio Machado
 Road Race Championships, Istvan Cziraki
 Time Trial Championships, Raivis Belohvoščiks
Stage 1 GP Gemenc, Krisztián Lovassy
GP Betonexpressz 2000, Gergely Ivanics
2010
Trophée Princier, Roberto Richeze
Trophée de la Maison Royale, Adriano Angeloni
2011
Stage 5 Vuelta al Uruguay, Alessandro Malaguti
Stage 6b Vuelta al Uruguay, Mauro Richeze
Banja Luka–Beograd I, Krisztián Lovassy
 Road Race Championships, Rida Cador
Stage 6, Tour of Romania, Krisztián Lovassy

Team roster

As of 26 July 2011

References

UCI Continental Teams (Europe)
Cycling teams established in 2006
Cycling teams based in Hungary